Siaosi Vaili (born 7 September 1977) is a Samoan former rugby union player. He played as a flanker.

Career
Vaili was born in Apia, Western Samoa. He moved to New Zealand playing for the provincial teams of Counties Manukau and Hawke's Bay. In the summer of 2003, he arrived in Europe, playing for the Exeter Chiefs, in the English second division. A season later, Vaili joined Worcester Warriors in the English Premiership, where he stayed for two seasons until 2006; and a year later, for Viadana Rugby, with which he won the 2006-07 Coppa Italia.

International career
He first played for Samoa in a test match against Ireland, at Lansdowne Road, on 11 November 2001, during the Samoa tour of Europe in 2001. He was part of the 2003 Rugby World Cup roster, playing only the match against Georgia. His last international cap was against Fiji, at Suva, on 12 June 2004.

Notes

External links

Siaosi Vaili at New Zealand Rugby History

1977 births
Sportspeople from Apia
Living people
Samoan rugby union players
Samoan expatriates in New Zealand
Samoan expatriates in Italy
Samoan expatriates in the United Kingdom
Rugby union flankers
Samoa international rugby union players
Exeter Chiefs players